Trend analysis is the widespread practice of collecting information and attempting to spot a pattern. In some fields of study, the term has more formally defined meanings.

Although trend analysis is often used to predict future events, it could be used to estimate uncertain events in the past, such as how many ancient kings probably ruled between two dates, based on data such as the average years which other known kings reigned.

Project management
In project management, trend analysis is a mathematical technique that uses historical results to predict future outcome. This is achieved by tracking variances in cost and schedule performance. In this context, it is a project management quality control tool.

Statistics
In statistics, trend analysis often refers to techniques for extracting an underlying pattern of behavior in a time series which would otherwise be partly or nearly completely hidden by noise. If the trend can be assumed to be linear, trend analysis can be undertaken within a formal regression analysis, as described in Trend estimation. If the trends have other shapes than linear, trend testing can be done by non-parametric methods, e.g. Mann-Kendall test, which is a version of Kendall rank correlation coefficient. Smoothing can also be used for testing and visualization of nonlinear trends.

Text 
Trend analysis can be also used for word usage, how words change in the frequency of use in time (diachronic analysis), in order to find neologisms or archaisms. It relates to diachronic linguistics, a field of linguistics which examines how languages change over time. Google provides tool Google Trends to explore how particular terms are trending in internet searches. On the other hand, there are tools which provide diachronic analysis for particular texts which compare word usage in each period of the particular text (based on timestamped marks), see e.g. Sketch Engine diachronic analysis (trends).

See also 
 Cool-hunting
 Extrapolation
 Horizon scanning
 Technology forecasting
 Weather forecasting

Notes

External links 
 Trend Analysis in Polls, Topics, Opinions and Answers
 Megatrends and connected trends download files

Regression with time series structure
Research methods
Project management techniques
Futures techniques